Archival Disc (AD) is the name of a trademark owned by Sony and Panasonic describing an optical disc storage medium designed for long-term digital storage. First announced on 10 March 2014 and introduced in the second quarter of 2015, the discs are intended to be able to withstand changes in temperature and humidity, in addition to dust and water, ensuring that the disc is readable for at least 50 years. The agreement between Sony and Panasonic to jointly develop the next generation optical media standard was first announced on 29 July 2013.

The discs were mass produced by Panasonic in 2016.

Specifications 
The discs are designed to hold 300 gigabytes of data in their first release, then a second version of the discs will hold up to 500 gigabytes, and eventually a third version of the discs will be able to store up to one terabyte of data, based on the roadmap plans of both companies.

The Archival Disc standard jointly developed by Sony and Panasonic will utilise signal processing technologies such as narrow track pitch crosstalk cancellation, high linear density inter-symbol interference cancellation and multi-level recording. The disc structure will feature dual sides, with three layers on each side, and a land and groove format. The track pitch is 0.225 μm, the data bit length is 79.5 nm, and the standard will utilise the method of Reed–Solomon Code error correction.

In 2019, Sony, co-developed with Panasonic, releasing its third generation Optical Disc Archival. In 2020, Sony began shipping out the Sony Gen3 PetaSite Optical Disc Archive, a storage solution that can store up to 2.9 million GB of data.

Roadmap 

In the summer of 2015, Sony was scheduled to release a roadmap plan to increase Archival Disc capacity from 300GB to 1TB per disc. Release timescales of the larger discs are currently unknown.

Use 
Sony expects the new standard to see usage in the film industry (such as storage of 4K resolution audiovisual data), archival services, and cloud data centres handling big data. The disc format is not intended as a consumer storage medium as of 2014, but is intended by the two companies as a solution for professional-level data archival. In order to reach a larger capacity whilst ensuring higher playback signal quality, the standard will employ crosstalk cancellation and partial-response maximum-likelihood (PRML) signal processing. Both companies will market the optical format under their respective brands.

Sony will be using Archival Disc in the Optical Disc Archive professional archival product range.  Sony's aim is to create at least a 6TB storage medium. Sony (as of 2020) sells 5.5TB Optical Disc Archive Cartridges.

An emerging use case for Archival Disc has been projected for cold data storage within the datacenter.

See also 
 M-DISC
 Optical Disc Archive

References

Audiovisual introductions in 2014
120 mm discs
Audio storage
Consumer electronics
Cloud storage
High dynamic range
High-definition television
Home video
Rotating disc computer storage media
Film and video technology
Japanese inventions
Television terminology
Video storage
Ultra-high-definition television